Gilbert J. Bouley (November 15, 1921 – February 8, 2006) was a professional American football player who played offensive lineman for six seasons in the National Football League (NFL) with the Cleveland / Los Angeles Rams. Bouley died in 2006.

References

1921 births
2006 deaths
People from Plainfield, Connecticut
Sportspeople from Windham County, Connecticut
Players of American football from Connecticut
American football offensive linemen
Boston College Eagles football players
Cleveland Rams players
Los Angeles Rams players